Maya Stojan (born 28 June 1986) is a Swiss actress based in the United States. She is known for her recurring roles on Castle and Agents of S.H.I.E.L.D.

Biography 
Maya Stojan was born in 1986 and raised in Geneva, Switzerland, where she was educated at the International School of Geneva. Her mother originates from Sri Lanka and her father from the Czech Republic. Stojan has a sister, speaks English and French at an advanced level, plays golf and runs Yoga and Transcendental Meditation. In 2008 she was awarded a Bachelor of Fine Arts in acting at the Hartt School of Theatre and Music, West Hartford, Connecticut. Then she moved to Los Angeles where Stojan premiered in the short films Chasing Forever and I Kill To Live. Stojan's further acting training took place in Los Angeles by Donovan Scott (2009), Carolyne Barry's workshops for Actors (2009) and at the Ivana Chubbuck Studio where she graduated the Master Class of 2011.

Maya Stojan played a supporting role in the US thriller Sinners and Saints and in further short films and television series, among them Entourage, Criminal Minds and the recurring character Kara Lynn Palamas/Agent 33 in Marvel's Agents of S.H.I.E.L.D. (8 episodes) in 2014 and 2015. Since 2013, her probably best known role is the recurring character Tory Ellis, an officer in the NYPD's Crime Scene Unit who specialises in technical analysis and supports Kate Beckett's team, in the US crime-series Castle.

Filmography

Personal life 
Stojan met American former rugby player Todd Clever through social media. They began dating in 2020 and currently reside in Cardiff-by-the sea, California.

The couple became engaged on 28 August 2020 and married 3 April 2021 on Lake Geneva.

References

External links 
 
 

1986 births
Living people
Actors from Geneva
21st-century Swiss actresses
Swiss people of Sri Lankan descent
Swiss people of Czech descent
Swiss film actresses
Swiss television actresses
International School of Geneva alumni